Pentti O. Snellman (17 February 1926 – 14 October 2007) was a Finnish athlete. He competed in the men's long jump at the 1952 Summer Olympics. 

Snellmann married Aili Annikki Pekkanen (1931–2020) in 1960. Snellman practiced medicine in Finland for ten years and in the United States from 1972 until his retirement in 1991.

References

External links
 

1926 births
2007 deaths
Athletes (track and field) at the 1952 Summer Olympics
Finnish male long jumpers
Olympic athletes of Finland
Finnish emigrants to the United States
People from Pori